Jones Field  is a city-owned, public-use airport located two nautical miles (4 km) north of the central business district of Bonham, a city in Fannin County, Texas, United States. It is included in the National Plan of Integrated Airport Systems for 2011–2015, which categorized it as a general aviation airport.

Facilities and aircraft 
Jones Field covers an area of 300 acres (121 ha) at an elevation of 618 feet (188 m) above mean sea level. It has one runway designated 17/35 with an asphalt surface measuring 4,000 by 75 feet (1,219 x 23 m).

For the 12-month period ending August 15, 2010, the airport had 5,700 general aviation aircraft operations, an average of 15 per day. At that time there were 25 aircraft based at this airport: 88% single-engine, 4% multi-engine, and 8% ultralight.

History

Originally dedicated as the Bonham city airport on November 11, 1929 as George Jones Airport.  The land was leased from the city of Bonham, and construction began in summer 1941.  The school opened on October 4, 1941, and had three hangars and a 1200’ x 100’ asphalt ramp among its facilities.   Activated by the United States Army Air Forces on October 4, 1941. Assigned to the USAAF Gulf Coast Training Center (later Central Flying Training Command) as a primary (level 1) pilot training airfield.

Base unit was  2547th Army Air Force Base Unit (Contract Pilot School, Primary). Pilot school operated by Bonham Aviation School under control of 302d Army Air Forces Flying Training Detachment.  This was a civil contract flying school, providing elementary flying training for the Army Air Forces.   At some point in time, probably in 1942, the property was purchased by the Defense Plant Corporation (who referred to it as PLANCOR 435) and leased back to Bonham Aviation School.  This was a typical arrangement for contract flying schools serving the Army Air Forces.

Flying training was performed with Fairchild PT-19s as the primary trainer. Also had several PT-17 Stearmans and a few P-40 Warhawks assigned.  The last student flew on 12 October 1944, and the school was inactivated on 16 October 1944 with the drawdown of AAFTC's pilot training program and was declared surplus and turned over to the Army Corps of Engineers. Eventually discharged to the War Assets Administration (WAA) returned to civil control.

See also 
 Texas World War II Army Airfields
 List of airports in Texas
 31st Flying Training Wing (World War II)

References 

 
 Manning, Thomas A. (2005), History of Air Education and Training Command, 1942–2002.  Office of History and Research, Headquarters, AETC, Randolph AFB, Texas 
 Shaw, Frederick J. (2004), Locating Air Force Base Sites, History’s Legacy, Air Force History and Museums Program, United States Air Force, Washington DC.

External links 

 Aerial image as of January 1996 from USGS The National Map
 
 

Airports in Texas
Buildings and structures in Fannin County, Texas
Transportation in Fannin County, Texas
Airfields of the United States Army Air Forces in Texas
USAAF Contract Flying School Airfields
1938 establishments in Texas
USAAF Central Flying Training Command
American Theater of World War II